Trombicula alfreddugesi, also called Eutrombicula alfreddugesi, is a species in the genus Trombicula. (Eutrombicula is a subgenus of mites in Trombicula of the family Trombiculidae.)

It is the common chigger species of the United States, also sometimes called the harvest mite. Chiggers are the parasitic larval stages of these free-living mites. They are rarely seen in the dry Western states because the species prefers humid climates. They are commonly found in undergrowth and grassy brush areas; the larvae host on animals (e.g. reptiles, birds, and wild and domestic mammals), causing welts that can turn into dermatitis.

References 

Trombiculidae
Arachnids of North America
Taxa named by Anthonie Cornelis Oudemans